The one-striped opossum (Monodelphis unistriata) is a possibly extinct opossum species from South America. It is known only from two specimens found in Brazil in 1821 and Argentina in 1899.

References

Opossums
Marsupials of South America
Mammals of Argentina
Mammals of Brazil
Critically endangered animals
Critically endangered biota of South America
Mammals described in 1842